The 1897 Kansas Jayhawks football team represented the University of Kansas in the Western Interstate University Football Association during the 1897 college football season. In their first season under head coach Wylie G. Woodruff, the Jayhawks compiled an 8–2 record (2–1 against conference opponents), finished second in the conference, shut out seven of ten opponents, and outscored all opponents by a combined total of 253 to 16. The Jayhawks played their home games at McCook Field in Lawrence, Kansas. A. R. Kennedy was the team captain.

Schedule

References

Kansas
Kansas Jayhawks football seasons
Kansas Jayhawks football